Daren Lee (born 10 January 1965) is an English professional golfer.

Lee was born in London. He won the silver medal as the leading amateur in The Open Championship at Muirfield in 1992. He turned professional later that year and played on the European Tour and its second tier Challenge Tour between 1993 and 2003. His best finish on the European Tour Order of Merit was 45th in 2001, the only year he made the top 100.

Strangely for a professional golfer, Lee never played a practice round prior to a tournament, instead preferring to simply walk the course.

Playoff record
European Tour playoff record (0–1)

Challenge Tour playoff record (0–1)

Results in major championships

Note: Lee only played in The Open Championship.

LA = Low amateur
CUT = missed the half-way cut
"T" = tied

References

External links

English male golfers
European Tour golfers
Golfers from London
1965 births
Living people